Boo Young-tae (born 2 September 1985) is a South Korean former football player. He formerly played for Busan IPark and Daejeon Citizen in the K-League.

In March 2010, he signed a contract with Persebaya Surabaya from the Indonesian Super League.

References

 

1985 births
Living people
South Korean footballers
South Korean expatriates in Indonesia
Expatriate footballers in Indonesia
K League 1 players
Busan IPark players
Daejeon Hana Citizen FC players
Persebaya Surabaya players
Association football forwards